In mathematics, Humbert series are a set of seven hypergeometric series Φ1, Φ2, Φ3, Ψ1, Ψ2, Ξ1, Ξ2 of two variables that generalize Kummer's confluent hypergeometric series 1F1 of one variable  and the confluent hypergeometric limit function 0F1 of one variable.

Definitions
The Humbert series Φ1 is defined for |x| < 1 by the double series:

where the Pochhammer symbol (q)n represents the rising factorial:

where the second equality is true for all complex  except .
 
For other values of x the function Φ1 can be defined by analytic continuation.

The Humbert series Φ1 can also be written as a one-dimensional Euler-type integral:

This representation can be verified by means of Taylor expansion of the integrand, followed by termwise integration.

Similarly, the function Φ2 is defined for all x, y by the series:

 
the function Φ3 for all x, y by the series:

the function Ψ1 for |x| < 1 by the series:

the function Ψ2 for all x, y by the series:

the function Ξ1 for |x| < 1 by the series:

and the function Ξ2 for |x| < 1 by the series:

Related series
 
There are four related series of two variables, F1, F2, F3, and F4, which generalize Gauss's hypergeometric series 2F1 of one variable in a similar manner and which were introduced by Paul Émile Appell in 1880.

References
  (see p. 126)
  (see p. 225)

 

Hypergeometric functions
Mathematical series